Grand Canyon Trail  is a 1948 American Western film starring Roy Rogers combining Western action with Three Stooges-style slapstick. Robert Livingston plays the head villain and James Finlayson plays the sheriff. The Republic Pictures film was shot in Trucolor, but only black and white prints survive.

Plot
Sintown is a ghost town that was once believed to have had a lode of silver, but the mines have been depleted. J. Malcolm Vanderpool's determined secretary Carol Martin impersonates Vanderpool's daughter and travels west to help her boss, who had invested in the mine. She discovers that Regan, a mining engineer employed by Vanderpool, has kidnapped Old Ed Carruthers, an old prospector who has found silver, but Regan wishes to keep the information secret for his own benefit. He puts Carol up in the haunted Hangman's Hotel until Roy Rogers, Old Ed's mule Genevieve and Roy's singing posse, the Riders of the Purple Sage, attempt to rescue the prospector and bring the villains to justice.

Cast
 Roy Rogers as Roy Rogers
 Trigger as Trigger, Roy's Horse
 Jane Frazee as Carol Martin aka Carol Vanderpool
 Andy Devine as Cookie Bullfincher
 Robert Livingston as Bill Regan
 Roy Barcroft as Dave Williams (Regan henchman)
 Charles Coleman as J. Malcolm Vanderpool
 Emmett Lynn as Old Ed Carruthers
 Ken Terrell as Mike Delaney (Regan henchman)
 James Finlayson as Sheriff
 Tommy Coats as Henchman Bannister
 Foy Willing as Singer, Rancher
 Riders of the Purple Sage as Singing Ranchers

External links
 

1948 films
Films directed by William Witney
Films scored by Nathan Scott
1948 Western (genre) films
Republic Pictures films
American Western (genre) films
Trucolor films
1940s English-language films
1940s American films